The Danish company Port of Aalborg A/S (formerly Aalborg Havn A/S), headquartered in the East Port in Aalborg, is one of largest commercial ports in Denmark. 

Port of Aalborg is an inter-model inland port providing transport by water, road and rail with a focus on developing the business park in the hinterland and nearby industrial areas. The company owns an area of 4.1 million m2 north and south of the fjord, where 100 companies are established, as well as transport centres and railway terminals that connect the port to the European rail network. 

Port of Aalborg Groups is a limited liability company wholly by Aalborg Municipality, with its board of directors comprising politicians, business people and internal employees. The Group employs 90 workers (2022). The parent company Port of Aalborg A/S is engaged in the following subsidiaries and associated companies: 

 Port of Aalborg Logistics A/S
 Aalborg Stevedore Company A/S 
 Port of Aalborg Research & Development 
 Port of Aalborg Real Estate A/S 
 Port of Aalborg Rail A/S 
 Port of Aalborg Tankstorage Aps
 Aalborg Toldopslag A/S

References list 

Aalborg
Transport in Aalborg